Andréa Parisy (sometimes credited as Andrée Parizy; 4 December 1935 – 27 April 2014), was a French film actress.

Born Andrée Marcelle Henriette Parisy in Levallois-Perret, she was best known for her roles in films such as Le Petit Baigneur and Bébés à gogo; she also appeared in the 1968 film Mayerling, in which she played Princess Stéphanie of Belgium.

Death
She died on 27 April 2014, aged 78, from undisclosed causes.

Selected filmography
 Les Compagnes de la nuit (1953) - Amie de Ginette (uncredited)
 The Slave (1953)
 Boum sur Paris (1953)
 Service Entrance (1954) - La seconde fille Grimaldi
 School for Love (1955) - (uncredited)
 Babes a GoGo (1956) - Pat - la fille d'Isabelle et Stéphane
 Paris, Palace Hotel (1956) - Une manucure (uncredited)
 Young Sinners (1958) - Clo
 The Restless and the Damned (1959) - Dominique Rancourt
 125, rue Montmartre (1959) - Catherine Barrachet
 Stefanie in Rio (1960) - Isabella Sampaio
 Le rendez-vous (1961) - Daphné
 Girl on the Road (1962) - Une autostoppeuse
 Portrait-robot (1962) - Clotilde
 Sweet and Sour (1963) - Une éplucheuse
 Greed in the Sun (1964) - Pepa
 Les Bons Vivants (1965) - Lucette, Baronne Seychelles du Hautpas (segment "Procès, Le")
 La Grande Vadrouille (1966) - Soeur Marie-Odile / Sister Marie-Odile
 Le Petit Baigneur (1968) - Marie-Béatrice Fourchaume
 Mayerling (1968) - Princess Stephanie
 Slogan (1969) - Françoise
 La Gueule de l'autre (1979) - Marie-Hélène Perrin
 The Favorite (1989) - Mihrişah
 No Scandal (1999) - Mme. Jeancourt

References

External links

1935 births
2014 deaths
People from Levallois-Perret
French film actresses
20th-century French actresses
Place of death missing